Probable DNA dC->dU-editing enzyme APOBEC-3D is a protein that in humans is encoded by the APOBEC3D gene.

This gene is a member of the cytidine deaminase gene family. It is one of seven related genes or pseudogenes found in a cluster, thought to result from gene duplication, on chromosome 22. Members of the cluster encode proteins that are structurally and functionally related to the C to U RNA-editing cytidine deaminase APOBEC1 and inhibit retroviruses, such as HIV, by deaminating cytosine residues in nascent retroviral cDNA.

References

Identification of APOBEC3DE as another antiretroviral factor from the human APOBEC family.
Dang Y, Wang X, Esselman WJ, Zheng YH.
J Virol. 2006 Nov;80(21):10522-33. doi: 10.1128/JVI.01123-06. Epub 2006 Aug 18.

External links

Further reading

EC 3.5.4